Shariq, Sharique or Sharik (Arabic: شارق) means rising from East (شرق), an indirect reference to the Sun.  It is a Muslim name also mentioned in the Quran. Shareek, (Arabic: شریک) means "Companion" or "Partner".

Sharik Ibn-e-Judair, 7th century Arabic military
Shariq Us Sabah (born 1993), Indian author and poet
Akhnas ibn Shariq, a contemporary to Muhammad and a leader of Mecca
Sharifuddin Shariq (born 1935), Indian politician 
Qurra ibn Sharik al-Absi, governor of Egypt in 709–715

Arabic-language surnames